Golden Ring Hotel is a five-star hotel in Moscow. The hotel is located just opposite the Ministry of Foreign Affairs Building and the Arbat Street, on Smolenskaya Ulitsa.

History
The hotel was built in 1970 as the Belgrade-I Hotel and used to serve foreign tourists (mostly from the Eastern bloc countries) who visited Russia with Intourist groups. et, the neighbouring Ministry of Foreign Affairs building or the Moskva River and its embankments.

References

External links
Official website

Hotels built in the Soviet Union
Hotels in Moscow
Hotels established in 1970
Hotel buildings completed in 1970
1970 establishments in Russia